The Federal University of Vales do Jequitinhonha e Mucuri (UFVJM) is a public university in Diamantina, Minas Gerais, established on September 30, 1953, as the Faculdade de Odontologia de Diamantina (Portuguese: Dentistry Faculty of Diamantina). It was promoted to a university in 2005, after the passing of federal law n° 11.173.

History

Foundation 
The Faculdade de Odontologia de Diamantina was founded on September 30, 1953, by then Governor of Minas Gerais Juscelino Kubitschek, looking to advance the development of the region. It was designed by Oscar Niemeyer, who had not yet achieved international fame at the time.

External links

 

Universities and colleges in Minas Gerais
1953 establishments in Brazil
Educational institutions established in 1953
Vale